Dennis Pursley is a retired American swimming coach who was the head coach of the combined men's and women's Alabama Crimson Tide swimming and diving teams of University of Alabama from 2012 to 2019. Several athletes Pursley coached have set world records, national records, and won medals in international competition. Pursley coached with his wife Mary Jo. They have five children.

Coaching career
Pursley was an assistant to Crimson Tide coaches Don Gambril and John Foster in the 1970s.  After leaving Alabama, Pursley coached the Lakeside Swim Club. He became part of the coaching staff of the 1979 USA Pan American Games team. Pursley coached Mary T. Meagher, Glenn Mills, and others onto the USA Olympic swimming team in 1980. Pursley later became head coach of the Cincinnati Marlins. Prior to the 1984 Olympics, Pursley was named as the first head coach of the Australian Institute of Sport (AIS). AIS athletes Pursley coached won half the medals for Australia in the 1984 Summer Olympics including Mark Stockwell. Pursley was appointed the first National Team Director for USA Swimming in 1989. Pursley was coach for the British team for the 2012 Summer Olympics.  In 2016, Pursley coached Kristian Gkolomeev to the Rio Olympics in the 50m and 100m freestyle.  He retired from coaching in April, 2019.

Education
He earned a bachelor's degree (1972) and a master's degree (1973) from the University of Alabama.

Honors and awards
 1980 ASCA Coach of the Year
 1980 USA Olympic Swimming Coach
 United States Olympic Committee Chairman's "Coaching Award" for 2000
 25 most influential people in the history of USA Swimming in 2003
 Inducted into the American Swimming Coaches Hall of Fame in 2006

References

Living people
American Olympic coaches
American swimming coaches
Sportspeople from Alabama
Sportspeople from Louisville, Kentucky
Australian Institute of Sport coaches
Year of birth missing (living people)